Miecznikowo-Miąchy  is a settlement in the administrative district of Gmina Janowiec Kościelny, within Nidzica County, Warmian-Masurian Voivodeship, in northern Poland.

The settlement has a population of 3.

References

Villages in Nidzica County